Ademar de Rocaficha (circa 1200 ?) was a troubadour, probably from Roquefixade in the County of Foix. He wrote at least two cansos, "Ges per freg ni per calor" and "Si amors fos conoissens", and one sirventes, "No.m lau de midons ni d'amor". The latter is a polemic against love (amor) and against man's preference for riches (rics) over true worth (valor).

References
Bibliografia Elettronica dei Trovatori, v. 2.0. Retrieved 4 October 2011.
Ademar de Rocaficha, Enciclopedia on line, Istituto dell'Enciclopedia Italiana.

12th-century French troubadours
French male poets
12th-century poets
Year of birth unknown
Year of death unknown